Curme Gray (1910–1980) was an American novelist.  His Science fiction novel, Murder in Millennium VI (1951) was the subject of a detailed analysis in Damon Knight's In Search of Wonder.

References

External links

1910 births
1980 deaths
20th-century American novelists
American male novelists
American science fiction writers
20th-century American male writers